Dictyna is a genus of  cribellate araneomorph spiders in the family Dictynidae, and was first described by Carl Jakob Sundevall in 1833.

Species
 it contains 118 species:

D. abundans Chamberlin & Ivie, 1941 – USA
D. agressa Ivie, 1947 – USA
D. alaskae Chamberlin & Ivie, 1947 – North America, Northern Europe, Russia (Europe to Far East)
D. albicoma Simon, 1893 – Venezuela
D. albida O. Pickard-Cambridge, 1885 – India, Pakistan, China (Yarkand)
D. albopilosa Franganillo, 1936 – Cuba
D. albovittata Keyserling, 1881 – Peru
D. alyceae Chickering, 1950 – Panama
D. andesiana Berland, 1913 – Ecuador
D. annexa Gertsch & Mulaik, 1936 – USA, Mexico
D. apacheca Chamberlin & Ivie, 1935 – USA
D. armata Thorell, 1875 – Ukraine, Georgia?
D. arundinacea (Linnaeus, 1758) (type) – North America, Europe, Turkey, Caucasus, Russia (Europe to Far East), Iran, Central Asia, China, Korea, Japan
D. bellans Chamberlin, 1919 – USA, Mexico
Dictyna b. hatchi Jones, 1948 – USA
D. bispinosa Simon, 1906 – Myanmar
D. bostoniensis Emerton, 1888 – USA, Canada
D. brevitarsa Emerton, 1915 – USA, Canada
D. cafayate Mello-Leitão, 1941 – Argentina
D. calcarata Banks, 1904 – USA, Mexico. Introduced to Hawaii
D. cambridgei Gertsch & Ivie, 1936 – Mexico
D. cavata Jones, 1947 – USA, Cuba
D. cebolla Ivie, 1947 – USA
D. chandrai Tikader, 1966 – India
D. cholla Gertsch & Davis, 1942 – USA, Mexico
D. colona Simon, 1906 – New Caledonia
D. coloradensis Chamberlin, 1919 – USA
D. columbiana Becker, 1886 – Venezuela
D. cronebergi Simon, 1889 – Turkmenistan
D. crosbyi Gertsch & Mulaik, 1940 – USA
D. dahurica Danilov, 2000 – Russia (South Siberia)
D. dauna Chamberlin & Gertsch, 1958 – USA, Bahama Is.
D. denisi (Lehtinen, 1967) – Niger
D. donaldi Chickering, 1950 – Panama
D. dunini Danilov, 2000 – Russia (Urals to Far East)
D. ectrapela (Keyserling, 1886) – Peru
D. felis Bösenberg & Strand, 1906 – Russia (Far East), China, Korea, Japan
D. fluminensis Mello-Leitão, 1924 – Brazil
D. foliacea (Hentz, 1850) – USA, Canada
D. foliicola Bösenberg & Strand, 1906 – Russia (Far East), China, Korea, Japan
D. formidolosa Gertsch & Ivie, 1936 – USA, Canada
D. fuerteventurensis Schmidt, 1976 – Canary Is.
D. gloria Chamberlin & Ivie, 1944 – USA
D. guerrerensis Gertsch & Davis, 1937 – Mexico
D. guineensis Denis, 1955 – Guinea
D. hamifera Thorell, 1872 – Greenland, Finland, Russia (Siberia)
Dictyna h. simulans Kulczyński, 1916 – Russia (West Siberia)
D. idahoana Chamberlin & Ivie, 1933 – USA
D. ignobilis Kulczyński, 1895 – Moldova, Armenia
D. incredula Gertsch & Davis, 1937 – Mexico
D. jacalana Gertsch & Davis, 1937 – Mexico
D. juno Ivie, 1947 – USA
D. kosiorowiczi Simon, 1873 – Western Mediterranean
D. laeviceps Simon, 1911 – Algeria
D. lecta Chickering, 1952 – Panama
D. linzhiensis Hu, 2001 – China
D. livida (Mello-Leitão, 1941) – Argentina
D. longispina Emerton, 1888 – USA
D. major Menge, 1869 – North America, Europe, Russia (Europe to Far East), Tajikistan, China
D. marilina Chamberlin, 1948 – USA
D. meditata Gertsch, 1936 – Mexico to Panama, Cuba
D. miniata Banks, 1898 – Mexico
D. minuta Emerton, 1888 – USA, Canada
D. moctezuma Gertsch & Davis, 1942 – Mexico
D. mora Chamberlin & Gertsch, 1958 – USA
D. namulinensis Hu, 2001 – China
D. navajoa Gertsch & Davis, 1942 – Mexico
D. nebraska Gertsch, 1946 – USA
D. obydovi Marusik & Koponen, 1998 – Russia (South Siberia)
D. ottoi Marusik & Koponen, 2017 – Azerbaijan, Georgia?, Iran?
D. palmgreni Marusik & Fritzén, 2011 – Finland, Russia (Europe to northeastern Siberia)
D. paramajor Danilov, 2000 – Russia (South Siberia)
D. peon Chamberlin & Gertsch, 1958 – USA, Mexico
D. personata Gertsch & Mulaik, 1936 – USA, Mexico
D. pictella Chamberlin & Gertsch, 1958 – USA
D. procerula Bösenberg & Strand, 1906 – Japan
D. puebla Gertsch & Davis, 1937 – Mexico
D. pusilla Thorell, 1856 – Europe, Turkey, Caucasus, Russia (Europe to Far East), Central Asia
D. quadrispinosa Emerton, 1919 – USA
D. ranchograndei Caporiacco, 1955 – Venezuela
D. saepei Chamberlin & Ivie, 1941 – USA
D. saltona Chamberlin & Gertsch, 1958 – USA
D. sancta Gertsch, 1946 – USA, Canada
D. schmidti Kulczyński, 1926 – Russia (West Siberia to Far East)
D. secuta Chamberlin, 1924 – USA, Mexico
D. sierra Chamberlin, 1948 – USA
D. similis Keyserling, 1878 – Uruguay
D. simoni Petrunkevitch, 1911 – Venezuela
D. sinaloa Gertsch & Davis, 1942 – Mexico
D. siniloanensis Barrion & Litsinger, 1995 – Philippines
D. sinuata Esyunin & Sozontov, 2016 – Ukraine, Russia (Europe)
D. sonora Gertsch & Davis, 1942 – Mexico
D. sotnik Danilov, 1994 – Russia (South Siberia)
D. subpinicola Ivie, 1947 – USA
D. sylvania Chamberlin & Ivie, 1944 – USA
D. szaboi Chyzer, 1891 – Austria, Hungary, Czech Rep., Slovakia, Russia (Europe), Kazakhstan
D. tarda Schmidt, 1971 – Ecuador
D. terrestris Emerton, 1911 – USA
D. togata Simon, 1904 – Chile
D. tridentata Bishop & Ruderman, 1946 – USA
D. tristis Spassky, 1952 – Tajikistan
D. trivirgata Mello-Leitão, 1943 – Chile
D. tucsona Chamberlin, 1948 – USA, Mexico
D. tullgreni Caporiacco, 1949 – Kenya
D. turbida Simon, 1905 – India, Sri Lanka
D. tyshchenkoi Marusik, 1988 – Russia (Urals to Far East)
Dictyna t. wrangeliana Marusik, 1988 – Russia (Wrangel Is.)
D. ubsunurica Marusik & Koponen, 1998 – Russia (South Siberia)
D. umai Tikader, 1966 – India
D. uncinata Thorell, 1856 – Europe, Turkey, Caucasus, Russia (Europe to Far East), Central Asia, China, Japan
D. uvs Marusik & Koponen, 1998 – Russia (South Siberia)
D. vittata Keyserling, 1883 – Peru
D. volucripes Keyserling, 1881 – North America
Dictyna v. volucripoides Ivie, 1947 – USA
D. vultuosa Keyserling, 1881 – Peru
D. xizangensis Hu & Li, 1987 – China
D. yongshun Yin, Bao & Kim, 2001 – China
D. zhangmuensis Hu, 2001 – China

References

External links
Dictyna at BugGuide

Araneomorphae genera
Dictynidae
Taxa named by Carl Jakob Sundevall